Ceasar is most often a misspelling of Caesar.

Ceasar may also refer to:

 Ceasar Mitchell (born 1968), American politician 
 Ceasar and Chuy, an American animated television series
 The Ceasars, a group of three Italian music producers